Gary Taylor (born 14 October 1961) is a former world's strongest man champion (1993). Competing in bodybuilding, Olympic weightlifting, and strongman.

Strength sports
A former weightlifter, powerlifter, and bodybuilder, Taylor competed at 6" (183 cm) and approximately 295 lbs (134 kg) during his strongman career. He competed in weightlifting at the 1984 Summer Olympics in Los Angeles, taking second in the snatch in the 110 kg class.

Gary is best known for winning the 1993 World's Strongest Man contest in Orange, France. He also finished 3rd in 1991, 5th in 1992, and 6th in 1995.

Taylor was extraordinarily strong on the Behind-The-Neck push press. At Brian Batcheldor's Strength Seminar in Birmingham in 1995, he performed an incredible Behind-The-Neck push press of 272.5 kg (600.75 lb) (judged by David Webster, the organizer of the World's Strongest Man competitions).

Gary suffered a career-ending knee injury during the tire flip event at the 1997 Europe's Strongest Man contest. The injury was so severe that it forced Gary to retire from strongman competition permanently.

Personal Records 
Bench Press – 235 kg (518 lb) raw.
Squat – 405 kg (892 lb)
Deadlift – 357 kg (786 lb) raw, no wrist straps.
Behind-the-Neck Push Press – 210 kg (462 lb) winning lift at 1995 World's Strongest Man Final 
Behind-the-Neck Push Press – 267.5 kg 1994

Retirement/later years
Taylor, now retired from competition, worked for the Control & Restraint team with Aylesbury Young Offenders Institute, a prison for Category A (highest and most considered dangerous), as well as being the Senior Gym Officer and rugby coach for Ampthill youth rugby team. He moved to Littlehey Prison Cat-C/YOI as a Security Governor. Gary currently does commentating and event organizing for the annual UK's Strongest Man contest. Gary now plays bowls at Flitwick Bowls Club in Bedfordshire.

World's Strongest Man results
1991 World's Strongest Man – 3rd
1992 World's Strongest Man – 5th
1993 World's Strongest Man – Winner
1994 World's Strongest Man – did not qualify for finals
1995 World's Strongest Man – 6th

References

1961 births
Living people
Welsh male weightlifters
Olympic weightlifters of Great Britain
Weightlifters at the 1984 Summer Olympics
Commonwealth Games competitors for Wales
Weightlifters at the 1982 Commonwealth Games
British strength athletes
Welsh strength athletes
British powerlifters
World Weightlifting Championships medalists